Task Force 90 can refer to:

Task Force 90 (Thailand), a special operations battalion of the Royal Thai Army
Task Force 90 (United States), a former task force of the US Navy